The Pirate Security Conference is since 2015 an annual conference about security topics in Munich. Since 2016 it cooperates with the Munich Security Conference. It is organized by Pirate Party Germany and international Pirate Parties. Most topics are about the impact of digital changes on foreign security and  politics.

References

Recurring events established in 2015
History of Munich
Annual events in Germany
Pirate parties
Foreign relations of Germany